Statistics of DPR Korea Football League in the 1995 season.

Overview
April 25 Sports Club won the championship.

League standings

References

DPR Korea Football League seasons
1
Korea
Korea